Mona Lisbeth Berglund Nilsson (born 1942) is a Swedish politician and former member of the Riksdag, the national legislature. A member of the Social Democratic Party, she represented Västra Götaland County West between October 1994 and October 2006. She was also a substitute member of the Riksdag for Karl-Erik Svartberg between October 1989 and November 1989.

References

1942 births
20th-century Swedish women politicians
20th-century Swedish politicians
21st-century Swedish women politicians
Living people
Members of the Riksdag 1994–1998
Members of the Riksdag 1998–2002
Members of the Riksdag 2002–2006
Members of the Riksdag from the Social Democrats
Women members of the Riksdag